The 2006 Telus Cup was Canada's 28th annual national midget 'AAA' hockey championship, played April 24–30, 2006 at the Charlottetown Civic Centre in Charlottetown, Prince Edward Island. The Prince Albert Mintos went undefeated throughout the tournament to win their first of two consecutive national titles, defeating the Calgary Buffaloes 5–4 in triple overtime in the gold medal game. Future National Hockey League players playing in this tournament included Dustin Tokarski, Yann Sauvé,  Jordan Eberle, and Alex Pietrangelo.

Teams

Round robin

Standings

Scores

Châteauguay 6 - St. John's 4
Prince Albert 7 - Calgary 2
Toronto 7 - Charlottetown 2
Prince Albert 5 - Châteauguay 0
Toronto 5 - Calgary 4
St. John's 6 - Charlottetown 4
Toronto 5 - Châteauguay 1
Prince Albert 6 - St. John's 3
Calgary 4 - St. John's 1
St. John's 4 - Toronto 3
Calgary 6 - Châteauguay 4
Prince Albert 4 - Charlottetown 1
Calgary 6 - St. John's 1
Prince Albert 4 - Toronto 0
Châteauguay 3 - Charlottetown 0

Playoffs

Semi-finals
Prince Albert 8 - Châteauguay 0
Calgary 3 - Toronto 2

Bronze-medal game
Châteauguay 4 - Toronto 3

Gold-medal game
Prince Albert 5 - Calgary 4 (3OT)

Individual awards
Most Valuable Player: Mike Connolly (Calgary)
Top Scorer: Mike Connolly (Calgary)
Top Forward: Matthew Robertson (Prince Albert)
Top Defenceman: Chris Markiewicz (Calgary)
Top Goaltender: Alan Reynolds (Toronto)
Most Sportsmanlike Player: Jordan Eberle (Calgary)

See also
Telus Cup

External links
2006 Telus Cup Home Page
Hockey Canada-Telus Cup Guide and Record Book

Telus Cup
Telus Cup
Sport in Charlottetown
April 2006 sports events in Canada
Ice hockey competitions in Prince Edward Island
2006 in Prince Edward Island